Migvan (lit. Colourful, Diversity) is a small urban kibbutz located in the city of Sderot in the northwestern Negev desert in Israel.

The kibbutz was founded in 1987, and the original six members of the group have expanded to 60 members. It is a mixed model of the urban kibbutz (collective economy, culture, and weekly meetings) with private homes

References

Further reading
Daniel Gavron.  The Kibbutz: Awakening from Utopia.  Lanham, Maryland: Rowman & Littlefield, 2000.
Jo-Ann Mort and Gary Brenner. "Our Hearts Invented a Place: Can Kibbutzim Survive Today's Israel?". Ithaca, NY: Cornell UP, 2003. 209 pages

External links
Official website 
A New Kibbutz Movement by James Grant-Rosenhead

Kibbutzim
Kibbutz Movement
Populated places in Southern District (Israel)

de:Sderot#Kibbuz Migwan
he:שדרות#מגוון